State Route 229 (SR 229) is a  route that serves as a connection between Interstate 85 (I-85) south of Tallassee to SR 63 south of Lake Martin in Elmore County.

Route description
The southern terminus of SR 229 is located at Exit 26 off I-85 south of Millstead. From Millstead, the route takes a northerly track to Tallassee. In Tallassee, the route briefly shares a concurrency with SR 14 whilst traveling in a northwesterly direction. Just to the south of Burlington, it splits from SR 14 and resumes a northerly track to Red Hill. At Red Hill, the route takes a turn to the west towards its northern terminus at SR 63.

Major intersections

References

229
Transportation in Macon County, Alabama
Transportation in Elmore County, Alabama